Edgardo Nilson González (30 September 1936 - 26 October 2007) was a Uruguayan football midfielder who played for Uruguay in the 1962 FIFA World Cup. He also played for C.A. Peñarol.

References

External links
 FIFA profile

1936 births
2007 deaths
Uruguayan footballers
Uruguay international footballers
Association football midfielders
Uruguayan Primera División players
Liverpool F.C. (Montevideo) players
Peñarol players
1962 FIFA World Cup players